Fozia Behram is a Pakistani politician who had been a member of the National Assembly of Pakistan from August 2018 till January 2023. She is a former member of the Provincial Assembly of the Punjab from Chakwal for the Pakistan Peoples Party (PPP), serving from 1988–1993 and 2008–2013. She joined Pakistan Tehreek-e-Insaf (PTI) in 2015.

References

Living people
Punjab MPAs 1988–1990
Punjab MPAs 1990–1993
Punjab MPAs 2008–2013
Pakistani MNAs 2018–2023
Pakistani people of Indian descent
Pakistan People's Party MPAs (Punjab)
Pakistan Tehreek-e-Insaf MNAs
People from Chakwal District
Women members of the Provincial Assembly of the Punjab
Women members of the National Assembly of Pakistan
Year of birth missing (living people)
21st-century Pakistani women politicians